Jonas Jones (May 19, 1791 – July 30, 1848) was a lawyer, judge, farmer, and political figure in Upper Canada.

Life
Jones was born in Augusta Township, Upper Canada in 1791, the son of Ephraim Jones. He was educated at John Strachan's school in Cornwall and studied law with Levius Peters Sherwood in Elizabethtown (Brockville). During the War of 1812, he enlisted with the Leeds militia, becoming a captain. He was called to the bar in 1815 and set up a practice in Brockville. In 1816, he was elected to the 7th Parliament of Upper Canada, representing Grenville and held that seat until 1828. Although conservative, he had his own views on the protection of individual rights and the independence of the elected assembly. However, he helped unseat Barnabas Bidwell in 1821. In 1822, he opposed the union of Upper and Lower Canada. He supported bills which helped fund the development of the Welland Canal, and he was a member of a committee which recommended further improvements of transportation along the Saint Lawrence River. He was appointed judge in the Bathurst and Johnstown District courts.

With his brother Charles Jones, who represented Leeds in the Legislative Assembly, he operated mills at Furnace Falls (Lyndhurst). He was a director of the Bank of Upper Canada branch at Brockville and, in 1834, became the president of the Saint Lawrence Inland Marine Assurance Company.

In 1833, he was appointed president of a commission to help improve navigation along the Saint Lawrence which met with American engineers and, in 1834, work began on a canal at Cornwall and other projects were planned. In 1836, he was elected to the 13th Parliament of Upper Canada representing Leeds. He was appointed to the Legislative Council in 1839, serving as speaker while John Beverley Robinson was on leave. He was appointed to the Court of the King's Bench in 1837.

In 1842, his daughter, Mary Elizabeth, married Lieutenant-General Charles Younghusband CB FRS, a British Army officer and meteorologist.

He died in Toronto in 1848, apparently of some form of seizure or stroke.

In 1817, Jones married Mary Elizabeth Ford. His oldest son David Ford later became a member of the Canadian House of Commons. His son Chilion was a business partner with architect Thomas Fuller in the reconstruction of the Canadian Parliament buildings.

References 
 

1791 births
1848 deaths
Members of the Legislative Assembly of Upper Canada
Members of the Legislative Council of Upper Canada
People from Leeds and Grenville United Counties
Upper Canada judges